The 2021–22 season is the 82nd season in the existence of RKC Waalwijk and the club's third consecutive season in the top flight of Dutch football. In addition to the domestic league, RKC Waalwijk will participate in this season's editions of the KNVB Cup.

Players

First-team squad

Transfers

In

Out

Pre-season and friendlies

Competitions

Overall record

Eredivisie

League table

Results summary

Results by round

Matches
The league fixtures were announced on 11 June 2021.

KNVB Cup

References

RKC Waalwijk seasons
RKC Waalwijk